Picnic Paranoia is an action game written  by Russ Segal for the Atari 8-bit family and published by Synapse Software in 1982. A version for the TI-99/4A was published by  Atarisoft in 1983.

Segal later wrote New York City for Synapse.

Gameplay

Playing as "George" the player attempts to protect their picnic from ants, who will carry off the food, spiders, who will weave webs to slow George down or bite, and wasps, who will sting to paralyze. While fending off the insects the player must move the food back on to the tables. Points are gained for food still visible on the screen at the end of each round. Each round lasts 90 seconds. There are sixteen rounds in a game. If all the food is pushed off the screen the game ends.

Reception
Allen Doum reviewed the game for Computer Gaming World, and stated that "Animation and graphics are excellent. George, the wasp, and a multitude of ants all move smoothly around the screen, though the spiders suffer by comparison. Sound cues for walking, being stung, the wasp, and for food being pushed are all well done. The music that accompanies the copywrite screen is great, even by Synapse standards."

Reviews
Electronic Fun with Computers & Games (Jul, 1983)
Compute!
Creative Computing
Softalk

References

1982 video games
Action video games
Atari 8-bit family games
TI-99/4A games
Synapse Software games
Video games about food and drink
Video games about insects
Video games developed in the United States
Works about picnics
Video games about ants